Alexis González may refer to:

 Alexis González (footballer) (born 1992), Paraguayan footballer
 Alexis González (volleyball) (born 1981), Argentine volleyball player
 Alexis Massol González, civil engineer and environmentalist from Puerto Rico